, whose name is also transliterated as Elyar Ganiyev and Elyer Ganiev (born January 7, 1960), has served as the Minister of Foreign Economic Affairs, Investments and Trade in the Government of Uzbekistan since July 2006. He served as Minister of Foreign Affairs of Uzbekistan and Deputy head of the cabinet from February 4, 2005 to July 12, 2006. Uzbek President Islam Karimov appointed and removed Ganiev from that position.

Ganiyev announced on October 19, 2006 in the International Uzbek Cotton Fair in Tashkent that Uzbekistan is expected to produce over 1 million tons of cotton fibers in 2007. The Government plans on exporting 750,000-800,000 tons.
In July 2013, Ganiyev held the office of Minister of Foreign Economic Relations, Investments, & Trade.

References

External links 

1960 births
Living people
Foreign Ministers of Uzbekistan